The Cape Chidley Islands are members of the Arctic Archipelago in the territory of Nunavut. They are located in the Labrador Sea at the south end of the entrance to the Hudson Strait, north of Killiniq Island's Cape Chidley, and separated from Killiniq Island by the MacGregor Strait.

Pert Island is the smaller of the two islands and is located  mile to the west.

References 

Islands of the Labrador Sea
Uninhabited islands of Qikiqtaaluk Region